James Caulfeild Browne, 2nd Baron Kilmaine  (16 March 1765 – 23 May 1825) was an Anglo-Irish Member of Parliament and landowner. He sat in the House of Commons of Ireland in 1790.

He was an MP for Carlow Borough from January 1790 to May 1790.

He was the eldest son of John Browne, 1st Baron Kilmaine, and his wife, Hon. Alicia Caulfeild, daughter of James Caulfeild, 3rd Earl of Charlemont. He resided at Gaulstown House.

References
 

1765 births
1825 deaths
Members of the Parliament of Ireland (pre-1801) for County Carlow constituencies
Barons in the Peerage of Ireland
James